Kilsheelan is a village and civil parish within the in the barony of Iffa and Offa East in County Tipperary, Ireland. It is also one half of the Roman Catholic parish of Kilsheelan & Kilcash in the Roman Catholic Diocese of Waterford and Lismore.

As of 2016, it had a population of 812 people. 

Kilsheelan is notable in having won the Tidy Towns competition twice, in both 1975 and 1979. It is represented by the Kilsheelan-Kilcash GAA club.

History

Excavations in 2006 at a residential development revealed evidence of settlement at the village dating back to early neolithic period. Finds included pottery fragments, stone blades and seeds.

The name of the village in Irish is Cill Síoláin, meaning church of Síolán/Sillan. Síolán is thought to be an early Irish saint probably Sillan, abbot of Bangor Abbey in Bangor, County Down. Síolán can translate to either "seed-basket" or "cullender/sieve".

In 1853 Kilsheelan railway station was opened by the Waterford, Limerick and Western Railway, later taken over by the Great Southern & Western Railway, it being one of many small provincial stations to serve settlements along the route. It was closed in 1963 to passengers and then to goods in 1976. Until 1984 the station served as a block post, at which point sidings and loop were removed. The original Great Southern & Western signal box remains extant, being used to house operator of the adjacent manual level crossing on the R706 road.

Historical population
Population shown accounts for the entire parish of Kilsheelan starting in 1831.

Geography

Townlands
There are 21 townlands in Kilsheelan.
Ballinvoher
Ballyboe
Ballydine (Baile Uí Dhiana)
Ballyglasheen (Baile Uí Ghlaisín)
Ballyglasheen Little (Baile Uí Ghlaisín Beag)
Ballynaraha (Baile na Rátha)
Ballynevin
Butlerstown (Baile na mBuitléarach)
Clashanisky
Cloghcarrigeen East (Cloch Charraigín Thoir)
Cloghcarrigeen West (Cloch Charraigín Thiar)
Clonwalsh
Eustaceland (Fearann Iústáis)
Gammonsfield (Gort an Ghambúnaigh)
Gortbrack (An Gort Breac)
Greensland (An tArd Glas)
Kilsheelan (Cill Síoláin)
Knockanclash
Lisbalting
Lisnatubbrid
Mauganstown (Baile Mhágúin)
Minorstown (Baile an Mhionúraigh)
Mullenaranky
Poulakerry (Poll an Choire)
Priorstown
Seskin (An Seisceann)
Skehanagh (An Sceachánach)
Temple-Etney

Facilities
Kilsheelan has four pubs, three hairdressers, a church and adjoining cemetery, two shops, a post office, primary school, Playschool, and a car dealership.

In 2004, Marilyn Manson married the burlesque performer Dita Von Teese in a ceremony at Castle Gurteen de la Poer in Kilsheelan. The castle is the home of artist Gottfried Helnwein since 1998, and was built in 1863 by the de la Poer family.

Transport 
The Limerick–Rosslare railway line passes through Kilsheelan but the station is closed.  Clonmel railway station, some 9 km distant, is now the nearest railway station. Kilsheelan is served by Bus Éireann routes 7 (Dublin to Cork), 55 (Waterford to Limerick) & 367 (Carrick-on-Suir to Clonmel).

Gallery

See also 
List of civil parishes of County Tipperary
Castle Gurteen de la Poer
Kilsheelan–Kilcash GAA

References

External links 
 The Tidy Towns of Ireland "Celebrating 50 years"
 Kilsheelan Bridge – Buildings of Ireland
 Saint Mary's Church – Buildings of Ireland

Parishes of the Roman Catholic Diocese of Waterford and Lismore
Towns and villages in County Tipperary
Civil parishes of Iffa and Offa East